Overton Hill is a 571 ft (174 m) hill at the southern edge of the Marlborough Downs in Wiltshire, England. The A4 road passes close to the north, and to the south is the River Kennet.

The hill is notable for being the start point of the Ridgeway National Trail, which follows an ancient trackway. There several scheduled archaeological sites including several round barrows (burial mounds) on it, and the site of an Iron Age wooden circle known as The Sanctuary, indicating human activity for thousands of years. The hill is part of the Avebury section of the Stonehenge and Avebury World Heritage Site.

References 

Hills of Wiltshire
History of Wiltshire
Archaeological sites in Wiltshire